John Alston Maxton, Baron Maxton (born 5 May 1936) is a Scottish Labour Party politician. From 1979 to 2001 he was a backbencher Member of Parliament (MP) in the House of Commons.

Early life
He is a nephew of the former Independent Labour Party leader and World War I conscientious objector, James Maxton.  His father, also named John Maxton, was also a conscientious objector in World War I, and the younger John Maxton was himself a conscientious objector from 1955 to 1957, working on building sites and in farming. He was educated at Lord Williams's Grammar School, Thame, and subsequently attended University College, Oxford.

Political career
He joined the Labour Party in 1970 and became a prominent campaigner as Vice Chairman of the group Scottish Labour Against the Market during the 1975 referendum on continuing British membership of the Common Market. He was selected to oppose the sitting MP, the Shadow Secretary of State for Scotland, Teddy Taylor, at the 1979 general election in the Glasgow Cathcart constituency. The changing demographics of the area and Labour's increasing popularity in Scotland made it a winnable seat, and Maxton's victory was made more likely by the Conservative Party's strident opposition to the Scottish National Party, which drove some of its voters back to Labour.

Maxton was the only Labour candidate at that election to gain a seat won by the Conservatives at the previous general election. In Parliament, he allied with the left in the Tribune Group, and voted against the Falklands War. In 1983, his constituency was redrawn to his disadvantage, but Maxton ruled out a move to any neighbouring and more favourable areas; he therefore notionally gained his seat from the Conservatives again in the 1983 general election. Maxton was a popular backbencher, but did not obtain much support when he stood for election to the Labour Shadow Cabinet. He was Labour's Scottish Whip in 1985 and a spokesman on Scottish Affairs from 1985 to 1992.

He stood down from the House of Commons at the 2001 general election and was given a life peerage on 17 June 2004, as Baron Maxton, of Blackwaterfoot in Ayrshire and Arran.

References

External links
 Biography Site
 

1936 births
Living people
Politicians from Glasgow
British conscientious objectors
Scottish conscientious objectors
Scottish Labour MPs
Members of the Parliament of the United Kingdom for Glasgow constituencies
Labour Party (UK) life peers
UK MPs 1979–1983
UK MPs 1983–1987
UK MPs 1987–1992
UK MPs 1992–1997
UK MPs 1997–2001
Life peers created by Elizabeth II